Formule X is a Maurer Söhne X-Car roller coaster at Drievliet amusement park in The Hague, the Netherlands. It opened on April 6, 2007. Formule X was the first X-car coaster to have an LSM launch.

Technical information
It contains two never-before-seen inversions and a 135° over-banked turn. There are two trains which can each hold 6 passengers. The LSM launch accelerates from 15 to 70 km/h (6–45 mph) in just 2 seconds. The ride has small dimensions in comparison to other rides: the ride is built on a 50 m × 50 m surface (160 ft × 160 ft). Formule X can handle 650 passengers an hour.

Ride experience
The ride starts with a right turn exiting the station. After this first inversion, the train enters a horseshoe turn, followed by an airtime hill. Next, the train maneuvers through a second inversion, a combination of a half-corkscrew and half of a heartline roll. The train then goes through a 135° overbanked turn, and finally enters the brake run.

Theming
Formule X has little theming. It has some traffic lights counting down for launch, and a few wheels and petrol barrels are spread over the terrain.

Roller coasters introduced in 2007